Sosnovka is a rural locality (a selo) in Burlukskoye Rural Settlement, Kotovsky District, Volgograd Oblast, Russia. The population was 163 as of 2010. There are 8 streets.

Geography 
The village is located in steppe, in the valley of the Medveditsa River, 290 km from Volgograd, 63 km from Kotovo.

References 

Rural localities in Kotovsky District